Kyiv-Demiivskyi (before 1950 Kyiv-2, and until 2017 Kyiv-Moskovskyi) is a railway stop that is located in Kyiv, Ukraine. It is part of the Kyiv Directorate of (Southwestern Railways).

Railway stations in Kyiv
Southwestern Railways stations
Railway stations opened in 1870
1870 establishments in Ukraine